Hlučín Region is a historically significant part of Czech Silesia, now part of the Moravian-Silesian Region in the Czech Republic. It is named after its largest town, Hlučín.

Municipalities
In terms of the current municipal division, the region consists of the following 27 municipalities. Towns are shown in bold.

Bělá (Bielau) – Bohuslavice (Buslawitz) – Bolatice (Bolatitz) – Chlebičov (Klebsch) – Chuchelná (Kuchelna) – Darkovice (Groß Darkowitz) – Dolní Benešov (Beneschau) – Hať (Haatsch) – Hlučín (Hultschin) – Hněvošice (Schreibersdorf) – Kobeřice (Köberwitz) – Kozmice (Kosmütz) – Kravaře (Deutsch Krawarn) – Ludgeřovice (Ludgierzowitz) – Markvartovice (Markersdorf) – Oldřišov (Odersch) – Píšť (Pyschcz / Sandau) – Rohov (Rohow) – Šilheřovice (Schillersdorf) – Služovice (Schlausewitz) – Štěpánkovice (Schepankowitz) – Strahovice (Strandorf) – Sudice (Zauditz) – Třebom (Thröm) – Velké Hoštice (Groß Hoschütz) – Vřesina (Wreschin) – Závada (Zawada bei Beneschau)

These municipalities cooperate in microregion Sdružení obcí Hlučínska since 1992.

Also, the former municipalities of Malé Hoštice (Klein Hoschütz), now district of Opava, and Hošťálkovice (Hoschialkowitz), Lhotka (Ellguth), Petřkovice (Petershofen), Koblov (Koblau) and Antošovice (Antoschowitz), now districts or parts of Ostrava, once belonged to the region.

Geography
Hlučín Region lies in the Opava Hilly Land within the Silesian Lowlands. The Opava River flows through the region. there are several water bodies, the largest are the artificial lakes Hlučínské and Jezero, and Nezmar fish pond.

History
Archaeological finds suggest that the area was inhabited since 4500 to 2500 BC.

The mediaeval bishoprics of both Olomouc and Wrocław attempted to control it. In the end, Olomouc won the dispute, and the area became part of the March of Moravia. In 1269, Hlučín belonged to the lands that were split off Moravia by King Ottokar II of Bohemia as the Duchy of Opava, ruled by his illegitimate son Duke Nicholas I. Differences in culture, traditions and economic development from the rest of Moravia then grew, mainly caused by Germanisation during the course of the Ostsiedlung. From 1526 onwards, the Duchy of Troppau, along with the Lands of the Bohemian Crown, was part of the Habsburg monarchy.

The history of Hlučín Region as an entity began with the Treaty of Breslau, signed on 11 June 1742 between King Frederick II of Prussia and Empress Maria Theresa of Austria. In 1740, Prussia started the First Silesian War and conquered most of Silesia. According to the terms of the treaty, the Duchy of Troppau was partitioned; and the lands south of the Opava River remained with Austrian Silesia, the northern part around Hlučín fell to Prussia and was incorporated into the Province of Silesia in 1815.

With Prussia becoming part of the German Empire in 1871, Hlučín, after the German defeat in World War I, became the site of an international dispute, as it was inhabited mostly by Czech speakers. On 4 February 1920, Hlučín Region was handed over without a referendum to Czechoslovakia, according to Article 83 of the Treaty of Versailles, though surveys suggested that its people felt more as being part of Upper Silesia and mostly would have preferred to join the German Weimar Republic.

Czechoslovak troops and authorities did not receive the friendly reception that they had expected as "liberators". When the Czechoslovaks moved into Deutsch-Krawarn, the whole population was in the streets and sang in unison the Deutschlandlied. Minor border corrections followed in the next few years.

Even though the region's German speakers were officially protected in their rights by Czechoslovakia, repressions on language policy and schooling in German were instituted. The enforcement of a Czechoslovak identity on the citizens also raised public opposition.

On 1 October 1938, Hlučín Region was occupied by Nazi Germany, as part of the area taken from Czechoslovakia, with the Munich Agreement. However, unlike the other formerly Czechoslovak domains, it was not attached to the Reichsgau Sudetenland but again to the Prussian Province of Silesia (Upper Silesia from 1941).

After World War II, Hlučín Region, like the rest of the Sudetenland, was returned to Czechoslovakia. However, unlike millions of other German speakers in the country, the region was spared a mass expulsion, and only 3000 citizens had to emigrate.

After the 1993 dissolution of Czechoslovakia, the region became part of the Czech Republic. Today, a sizable number of the region's citizens are binationals and also have German citizenship.

Sights
Main sights of the region are:
 Nature reservation Dařanec near Vřesina
 Castles in Hlučín, Kravaře, Šilheřovice, Dolní Benešov, Velké Hoštice, Chuchelná and Oldřišov
 Open-air museums in Bolatice and Kobeřice
 Museum of the fortifications in Hlučín
 Church buildings in Ludgeřovice, Hněvošice, pilgrimage place in Píšť
 Hlučín Lake

Partner regions
 Plateau of the Good Land LAG, Poland

See also
Czech Silesia
Rychtal Region

References

External links
 

 
Opava District
Czech Silesia